Blackthorn or sloe is Prunus spinosa, a species of Prunus native to Europe, western Asia, and locally in northwest Africa.

Other plant species also named 'blackthorn' are:
 Australian blackthorn (Bursaria spinosa), a small shrub in the family Pittosporaceae
 Blackthorn or black-thorn acacia (Senegalia mellifera) of the Afrotropics and Arabia

Blackthorn may also refer to:

 Blackthorn (American band), an American Celtic rock band
 Blackthorn (character), character in Marvel Comics
 Blackthorn (film), a 2011 Western film directed by Spanish director Mateo Gil 
 Blackthorn (musician), Norwegian metal musician
 Blackthorn (Russian band), a Russian symphonic extreme metal band
 Blackthorn, Oxfordshire, England
 Blackthorn railway station, Oxfordshire, England
 Blackthorn Cider, a processed commercial cider
 Blackthorn Trust, a British charity
 Lord Blackthorn, a recurring character in the Ultima game series
 USCGC Blackthorn (WLB-291), a United States Coast Guard ship
 Blackthorn City, a town in the Pokémon games universe; see 
 A British tag game from the 19th century; see

See also
 Black Thorn (disambiguation)
 Blackthorne (disambiguation)